Koszele  is a settlement in the administrative district of Gmina Susiec, within Tomaszów Lubelski County, Lublin Voivodeship, in eastern Poland.

References

Koszele